Fittonia albivenis is a species of flowering plant in the family Acanthaceae, native to the rainforests of Colombia, Peru, Bolivia, Ecuador and northern Brazil. An evergreen perennial, it is notable for its dark green foliage with strongly contrasting white or red veins. It is commonly called nerve plant or mosaic plant. In temperate regions where the temperature falls below  it must be grown as a houseplant.

Description

Small buds may appear after time where the stem splits into leaves. There are also forms in which the nervatura is carmine-red. Flowers are small with a white to off-white color.

Cultivation
The species is used as an ornamental plant that requires fertile soils or substrates based on peat. It is best kept in a moist area with mild sunlight, although it does not demand much light, and temperatures above . As such, in temperate locations it must be kept under glass as a houseplant.

It must be watered regularly. Without water for a few days, it is known to "faint" but is easily revived with a quick watering and resumes its healthiness. Fittonia albivenis is known to be hard to grow, so it is best bought at a nursery then cared for. Its spreading habit makes it ideal as groundcover.

Numerous cultivars have been selected, of which the Argyroneura Group and the Verschaffeltii Group have gained the Royal Horticultural Society's Award of Garden Merit.

Uses
The Kofan, Siona and Secoya tribes of the Ecuadorian Amazon use F. albivenis as a treatment for headaches, and muscular pain, its leaves were used by the Machiguenga as a hallucinogen before they were introduced to Psychotria viridis. They are said to "produce visions of eyeballs." The leaves of this species are prepared as a tea in the northwestern part of the Amazon region and used for toothache.

See also
Psychedelic plants

References

External links

Fittonia albivenis (Verschaffeltii Group)

Acanthaceae
Medicinal plants of South America
House plants
Flora of Ecuador
Flora of Colombia
Flora of Peru
Flora of Bolivia
Flora of Brazil
Ornamental plants
Low light plants